The Sky Lords (1988) is a science fiction novel by the Australian author, John Brosnan. It was published by VGSF and is the first book in the Sky Lords trilogy. It was followed in 1989 by War of the Sky Lords and in 1991 by The Fall of the Sky Lords.

The whole series was one of the first contemporary science fiction serials published in Eastern European countries like Bulgaria  and Russia, in the early to mid-1990s, but, after a brief wave of popularity, has not been reprinted in paper since. The e-book division of VGSF, SF Gateway republished the book as an Amazon Kindle e-book.

Plot 
The story is set in the future, after the 'Gene Wars' have turned the Earth into a blighted wasteland. The inhabitants of Earth live a tribal-like existence and offer tributes to the Sky Lords. The Sky Lords live in giant airships and are the rulers of the people below. The protagonist (Jan Dorvin) is taken as a slave by the Sky Lords when her people rebel against their masters. The novel follows her fight for freedom and her relationship with Milo, a genetically altered survivor of the Gene Wars.

References

External links
 SF Gateway website
 

1988 fantasy novels
1988 Australian novels
Australian science fiction novels